Ensign Ro may refer to:

Ro Laren
"Ensign Ro" (Star Trek: The Next Generation)